René Okle (born 1 January 1983) is a German former footballer who played as a defender.

References

External links
 Profile at DFB.de
 Profile at kicker.de

1983 births
Living people
People from Alb-Donau-Kreis
Sportspeople from Tübingen (region)
Footballers from Baden-Württemberg
German footballers
Association football defenders
SSV Ulm 1846 players
VfR Aalen players
3. Liga players
Regionalliga players